The Oakland Press is a daily newspaper published in Oakland County, Michigan with headquarters in Troy. It is owned by 21st Century Media, with which its parent company merged in 2013 after filing for bankruptcy. The local historical society traces its origins to The Pontiac Gazette, founded in 1843.  The paper has been published under various names, including The Pontiac Press, until it was renamed The Oakland Press in 1972.  Original editorials and reporting, including major-sport beat writers, are also carried in the sister paper The Macomb Daily.

References

External links

 
 OaklandPress Bio

Oakland Press
Oakland Press
21st Century Media publications